Rose Center may refer to one of these centers in the United States:

 Rose Center (Tennessee), a community cultural center in Morristown, Tennessee, housed in the Rose School built in 1892 as the town's first coeducational public high school
 Rose Center for Earth and Space, part of the American Museum of Natural History in New York City, New York
 Rose Center for Public Leadership, originally founded by Daniel Rose at the Urban Land Institute in Washington, DC